Divine Aide Omo is a Nigerian taekwondo practitioner, who competes in the women's senior category. She won a bronze medal at the, 2011 All-African Games in the 53 kg category.

Sports career 
Divine Aide won a bronze medal in the 53 kg event at the 2011 All-African Games held in Maputo, Mozambique.

References 

Year of birth missing (living people)
Living people
Nigerian female taekwondo practitioners
Competitors at the 2011 All-Africa Games
African Games medalists in taekwondo
African Games bronze medalists for Nigeria
21st-century Nigerian women